Aleksi Kiviaho (17 September 1913, Evijärvi - 1 July 1986) was a Finnish smallholder and politician. He was a member of the Parliament of Finland from 1954 to 1970, representing the Finnish People's Democratic League (SKDL).

References

1913 births
1986 deaths
People from Evijärvi
People from Vaasa Province (Grand Duchy of Finland)
Finnish People's Democratic League politicians
Members of the Parliament of Finland (1954–58)
Members of the Parliament of Finland (1958–62)
Members of the Parliament of Finland (1962–66)
Members of the Parliament of Finland (1966–70)